Justin Rosenberg is a Professor in International Relations at the University of Sussex. He received his PhD from the London School of Economics in 1993 with a thesis titled Social structures and geopolitical systems: A critique of the Realist theory of International Relations. Within academia, Rosenberg is associated with "New Marxist" international relations theory. His first book, The Empire of Civil Society formed a Marxist critique of Realist and Neo-Realist theories of International Relations. He has since changed his view of the relation of domestic and international factors as part of his move towards a theory of Uneven and combined development.

References

External links
Personal website (archived link, 14 September 2007)

Academics of the University of Sussex
Marxist theorists
Deutscher Memorial Prize winners
Living people
International relations scholars
Year of birth missing (living people)